The Order of Saint Lucia is an order of chivalry established in 1986 by Elizabeth II. The Order comprises seven classes. In decreasing order of seniority, these are:
 Grand Cross of the Order of Saint Lucia (GCSL)
 Knight/Dame Commander of the Order of Saint Lucia (KCSL/DCSL)
 Saint Lucia Cross (SLC)
 Saint Lucia Medal of Honour (SLMH)
 Saint Lucia Medal of Merit (SLMM)
 Saint Lucia Les Pitons Medal (SLPM)
 National Service Cross (NSC)
 National Service Medal (NSM)

The Order is bestowed by the Governor-General on behalf of the Sovereign and on the advice of the Prime Minister. The Governor-General has the right to exercise all powers and authorities of the Sovereign in respect of the Order.

In February 2016, for the first time in the Order's history, the Queen approved the awarding of the grades of Knight and Dame.

Awards Committee
While the King is Sovereign of the Order and the Governor-General is Chancellor, there is also established an awards committee to decide on eligible members of the Order. Members of the committee include a Chairman appointed by the Governor-General after consultation with the Prime Minister and the Leader of the Opposition, the Chairman of the Public Service Commission, the Chairman of the Teaching Service Commission, the Commissioner of Police, and three persons representative of the General Public appointed by the Governor-General of whom two shall are appointed on the advice of the Prime Minister and one on the advice of the Leader of the Opposition. The committee secretary is appointed by the Governor General.

Eligibility
The Order may only be awarded to citizens of Saint Lucia. Honorary awards may be made to persons other than citizens of Saint Lucia and are made with the approval of the Sovereign on the advice of the Prime Minister. For Knight/Dame Commanders, appointments may only be awarded to no more than 3 persons every two years, and the number of living Knights/Dames shall not exceed 20 at any one time.

Insignia
The riband of the Order is composed of vertical stripes of the colours blue, gold, black, and white. When worn with the insignia of the Grand Cross of the Order of Saint Lucia or the Saint Lucia Cross, the riband is a width of two inches; and when worn with the insignia of the other Grades of the Order, the riband is the width of one and a half inches.

The Grand Cross is of Gold and the recipient shall is invested with a Star, and a Collar to which is affixed the Badge of the Order. Upon retirement from office of Governor-General the recipient is only entitled to wear the Star with and the Badge of the Order suspended from the Riband of the Order and worn round the neck.

The Cross of the Order is awarded in Gold and is worn from the Riband of the Order round the neck.

The Medal of Merit and the Medal of Honour can be awarded in Gold or Silver.

The Les Pitons Medal can be awarded in Gold, Silver or Bronze.

All of the medals are worn as a pendant from the riband of the Order from the left breast.

Precedence and privileges
When worn in Saint Lucia the Order takes precedence over all other decorations except the Victoria Cross and the George Cross.

Knights or Dames Grand Cross are entitled to the style "His Excellency" or "Her Excellency" and use the post-nominal "GCSL".

Knight/Dame Commanders are entitled to the prefix "Sir" (for knights) or "Dame" to their first names and use the post-nominal "KCSL" or "DCSL".

Saint Lucia Crosses are entitled to the style "The Honourable" and use the post-nominal "SLC".

Other ranks use the post-nominals "SLMH" (Saint Lucia Medal of Honour), "SLMM" (Saint Lucia Medal of Merit), "SLPM" (Les Pitons Medal) and "NSC" (National Service Cross).

Restrictions
The rank of Grand Cross is granted only to a person holding the office of Governor-General. The number of persons holding the Cross can not exceed 25 at any one time and no more than three people can be awarded the rank in any one year. All honorary appointments are supernumerary. The rank of Knight/Dame is

Recipients
Grand Cross of the Order of Saint Lucia
 1997 – Dame Calliopa Pearlette Louisy, GCSL, GCMG
 1996 – Sir George William Mallet, GCSL, GCMG, CBE
 1988 – Sir Stanislaus A. James, GCSL, GCMG
 1982 – Sir Allen Montgomery Lewis, GCSL, GCMG, GCVO, KStJ
 1980 – Boswell Williams, GCSL

Knight/Dame Commander of the Order of Saint Lucia
 2016 – Sir Derek Walcott, KCSL, OBE (For exceptional and outstanding service of national importance to Saint Lucia)
 2016 – Sir Vaughan Lewis, KCSL (For exceptional and outstanding service of national importance to Saint Lucia)
 2016 – Dame Lawrence Laurent, DCSL (For exceptional and outstanding service of national importance to Saint Lucia)

The Saint Lucia Cross
 2020 – Dr Jonathan Romel Daniel SLC (For Distinguished service in the field of Medicine and National Development)
 2020 – Joseph Anthony Francis Compton SLC (For Distinguished service in the field of National Development)
 2020 – Philip McDermott SLC (For Distinguished service to Saint Lucia in the field of Philanthropy) Honorary award
 2010 – Winston Clive Victor Parris, SLC, SLMM, CMG (for outstanding contribution in the area of medicine)
 2009 – George Theophilus, SLC (for outstanding contribution to the financial sector)
 2009 – Louis Bertrand George, SLC (for contribution to national development, especially to the field of Education)
 2008 – Arnott Francois Valmont, SLC (for outstanding contribution to the business community)
 2006 – Leon Felix Thomas, SLC (for distinguished and outstanding national service in the fields of Education and Public Administration)
 2005 – Charles Marie Emmanuel Cadet, SLC (for distinguished and outstanding service to Saint Lucia)
 2005 – Sir Julian Robert Hunte, SLC, KCMG, OBE (for distinguished and outstanding service to Saint Lucia)

Saint Lucia Medal of Merit
 1994 – Dame Marie Selipha Descartes "Sesenne"
2016 – Levern Spencer
2020 - David R. Williams (Gold)

See also
 Commonwealth realms orders and decorations
 Knight Bachelor

References

Member list
 Members: 2017
 Members: 2016
 Members: 2015
 Members: 2014
 Members: 2013
 Members: 2012
 Members: 2011
 Members: 2010
 Members: 2009
 Members: 2008
 Members: 2007
 Members: 2005
 Members: 2003
 Members: 2002
 Members: 2001
 Members: 2000

External links
 The Order of Saint Lucia with nomination form.
 Online Nominations
  The Constitution of the Order of Saint Lucia

 
Civil awards and decorations of St Lucia